Swifton is a city in Jackson County, Arkansas, United States. The mayor is Craig Crider. The population was 798 at the 2010 census. Swifton was the hometown of Baseball Hall of Famer George Kell.

Geography
Swifton is located at  (35.824274, -91.129001).

Demographics

2020 census

As of the 2020 United States census, there were 733 people, 374 households, and 237 families residing in the city.

2000 census
As of the census of 2000, there were 871 people, 335 households, and 245 families residing in the city. The racial makeup of the city was 97.93% White, 0.46% Black or African American, 0.11% Native American, 1.03% from other races, and 0.46% from two or more races.  2.30% of the population were Hispanic or Latino of any race.

There were 335 households, out of which 34.3% had children under the age of 18 living with them, 55.5% were married couples living together, 13.1% had a female householder with no husband present, and 26.6% were non-families. 25.1% of all households were made up of individuals, and 11.6% had someone living alone who was 65 years of age or older.  The average household size was 2.60 and the average family size was 3.09.

In the city, the population was spread out, with 28.0% under the age of 18, 7.7% from 18 to 24, 28.1% from 25 to 44, 22.5% from 45 to 64, and 13.7% who were 65 years of age or older.  The median age was 35 years. For every 100 females, there were 90.2 males.  For every 100 females age 18 and over, there were 91.7 males.

The median income for a household in the city was $24,375, and the median income for a family was $31,375. Males had a median income of $22,500, versus $15,682 for females. The per capita income for the city was $11,922.  About 17.5% of families and 22.9% of the population were below the poverty line, including 34.3% of those under age 18 and 24.0% of those age 65 or over.

Education
It is within the Jackson County School District. Tuckerman Elementary School, Swifton Middle School, and Tuckerman High School are the district schools.

On July 1, 2004, the Swifton School District was merged into the Jackson County School District.

Notable people
George Kell, Major League Baseball player, member of Baseball Hall of Fame
Skeeter Kell, Major League baseball player
Bobby Winkles, Major League and college baseball manager, raised in Swifton

References

External links

Cities in Jackson County, Arkansas
Cities in Arkansas